Honky is a derogatory term applied to people of the European descent in North America.

Honky may also refer to:

Music
 MC Honky, a mysterious musician widely considered to be Mark Oliver Everett, frontman of the band Eels
 Honky (album), a 1997 album by The Melvins
Honky, a 1981 album by Keith Emerson

Other uses
 Honky (film), a 1971 film
 Honky, a 2001 memoir by Dalton Conley about race relations in New York City
 Honky nuts, the fruit of Corymbia calophylla, an Australian gum tree

See also 
 Chicago Honky, a style of polka music
 
 Hunky (disambiguation)